Mocsa is a village in Komárom-Esztergom county, Hungary.

Early history

The village has existed for at least 770 years; it is first mentioned in 1237-1240 under the name of Mocha in the notes of Albeus, dean of Nitra, who had been asked by Béla IV of Hungary to catalogue the territories of the villages in the area.

During the Árpád Dynasty, the village was a property of the King; income from the land was used to maintain the Queen's court. The King's hunters and falconers lived in Mocsa.

In 1291, Fennena of Kujavia, the first wife of Andrew III of Hungary, granted the village's territory to Lodomer, the Archbishop of Esztergom. From this point on, the land was largely the property of the bishops.

During the reign of Béla IV, Mocsa had about four hundred and fifty residents. The villages in the area were mostly razed to the ground during the Tatar invasions, but the survivors helped to repopulate Mocsa by grouping together. Through the centuries the village was attacked on more than one occasion. Its survival is due to its location: a swampy, weedy, low-lying land that was unattractive to the invaders who preferred to travel over hilly lands that gave them a wide view of the places below. Mocsa's location also provided plenty of hiding places for the people and their animals. In times of draught, the residents survived because of their close proximity to water.

After the Battle of Mohács, the country suffered with years of taxation and occupation by the Ottoman Turks. Many villages died out entirely, and their territories were connected to the surviving villages—Mocsa being one of the survivors.

Nowadays Mocsa  have a great football team (Mocsa FC) with the famous defender László Dobai

World Wars

Five hundred and thirty soldiers from Mocsa took part in World War I. Out of them sixty-one lost their lives.

In World War II, there were seven hundred and forty soldiers from the village, two hundred and fifteen who were killed.

Between March 18–26, 1945, Mocsa was liberated by Soviet troops after a bloody battle.

The left-over grenades, bombs, and landmines caused troubles for the village in the years to follow. Over twenty people suffered serious injuries from grenade and landmine explosions. Four people were killed in such accidents, including a ten-year-old boy.

The Village Churches

Mocsa's Roman Catholic church was built in 1756 in the Baroque style. It was burned down along with the village in 1903, but was restored the next year.

The Protestant church was built in 1783. It was irrecoverably damaged by cannon blasts during World War II, and so a new church had to be built in 1955.

Notes

References

• Gutai István (1988). Mocsai Mozaik. Komárom: Komárom Megyei Nyomda Vállalat.

External links
 Street map (Hungarian)

Populated places in Komárom-Esztergom County